Khon Kaen International Airport (  is near the city of Khon Kaen in Khon Kaen Province, Thailand.

Airlines and destinations

Passenger

2021 airport upgrade
The airport has seen an annual growth rate of 20 percent annually since 2013, handling around two million passengers in 2017. The Department of Airports (DOA) has signed a memorandum of understanding (MOU) to upgrade Khon Kaen Airport by 2021. The two billion baht project will increase passenger capacity from 2.8 million to five million per year. The terminal will be expanded from 16,500 m2 to 44,500 m2 to accommodate 1,000–2,000 passengers per hour.

References

External links

 
 Khon Kaen Airport Homepage

Khon Kaen
Airports in Thailand
Airports established in 1963
Buildings and structures in Khon Kaen province